Jinkeng station, is a station of  Line 21 of the Guangzhou Metro. It started operations on 20 December 2019.

On 17 December 2019, Jinkeng Station was awarded the "Three-star Green Building Design Mark Certificate" by the Department of Housing and Urban-Rural Development of Guangdong Province, reaching the highest level in China's green building evaluation standards and becoming the first city rail transit line in mainland China to have a station that has obtained this certificate.

The station has 2 elevated island platforms, numbered 1 & 2 on the inside, and 3 & 4 on the outside. Trains usually stop at the middle 2 platforms (platforms 1 and 2), with the express trains also passing through the middle tracks.

Exits
There are 2 exits, lettered A and B. Both exits are accessible and are located on Guangshan Highway.

Gallery

References

Railway stations in China opened in 2019
Guangzhou Metro stations in Huangpu District